Abley is a surname. Notable people with the surname include:

John Abley (1930–2011), Australian rules footballer
Kevin Abley (born 1935), Australian rules footballer
Mark Abley (born 1955), Canadian poet, journalist, editor, and non-fiction writer

See also
Abler